The Stade Justin Peeters, (formerly the Justin Peeters Stadium) is a former football stadium located in Wavre near Brussels, Belgium and the former homeground of Racing Jet Wavre, that had come over the years to be found in the northeast of the city center under the significant address Avenue du Center Sportif. In 2021 the city converted it to a hockey field.

From its dimensions, the stadium is more than roomy enough for a club that plays its home games before a nearly three-digit number of viewers, because it includes two lush stands on the sides, so that the lack of development behind the goals not go into further weight falls. To be exact, will be released only heavily Raised grandstand for the games, where you can sit down to fifteen rows of green seat shells without backrests.  Within the main grandstand, specifically in the interior, there is a dressing room, and the cab from the club is little more than can follow the game. The opposite stands are built of wooden benches, are not accessible and it is probably better that way. A renovation is urgently needed because it makes a very worn-out impression. In the meantime, the opposite stands are temporarily used for advertising purposes, to set up a few billboards. Moreover, one can admire the character of the host club on the roof.

Sources

References

See also
 Racing Jet Wavre Football Club

Football venues in Wallonia
Sports venues in Walloon Brabant
Racing Jet Wavre